Jörgen Wålemark (born 3 April 1972) is a  Swedish football manager and former player.

Career 

He helped Ljungskile SK from the lower leagues to the Allsvenskan, only to leave the club for mostly foreign teams. He returned to Ljungskile in 2003, and the club was once again promoted in 2007. He retired 2008 at the end of "allsvenskan". In the summer 2009 he returned to football and Lsk.

In 2022 he was hired as the new assistant manager of Raufoss IL. Ahead of the 2023 season he was promoted to manager.

Clubs
    -1994 :  Ljungskile SK
1994-1995 :  St Johnstone F.C.
1995-1996 :  Ljungskile SK
1996-1997 :  Lillestrøm SK
1998-2000 :  IF Elfsborg
2000-2001 :  Enosis Neon Paralimni
2001-2003 :  AEL Limassol
2003-2009 :  Ljungskile SK

Clubs managed
2010-2011 :  Ljungskile SK
2011-2012 :  BK Häcken U19
2014-2017 :  Varbergs BoIS FC
2018      :  Jönköpings Södra IF
2018-2020 :  Ljungskile SK
2022      :  Raufoss IL (assistant)
2023-     :  Raufoss IL (assistant)

References

External links 
 

1972 births
Living people
Association football forwards
Swedish footballers
AEL Limassol players
Enosis Neon Paralimni FC players
St Johnstone F.C. players
Lillestrøm SK players
IF Elfsborg players
Ljungskile SK players
Swedish expatriate footballers
Expatriate footballers in Scotland
Expatriate footballers in Norway
Expatriate footballers in Cyprus
Swedish expatriate sportspeople in Scotland
Swedish expatriate sportspeople in Norway
Swedish expatriate sportspeople in Cyprus
Allsvenskan players
Scottish Football League players
Eliteserien players
Cypriot First Division players
Swedish football managers
Swedish expatriate football managers
Expatriate football managers in Norway
Raufoss IL managers